Coldheart Canyon is a novel by Clive Barker, published in 2001 by HarperCollins. The paperback edition was published by HarperTorch on November 5, 2002.  The story centers on Todd Pickett, a failing movie star, and Tammy Lauper, Todd's obsessive fan.

Synopsis
The story begins in Romania during the 1920s, where poverty and disease run rampant. American talent agent Willem Zeffer and the Romanian-born actress he represents, Katya Lupi, have travelled there in order to visit Katya's relatives.  Zeffer visits an old medieval castle which has been turned into a monastery and decides to buy a unique work of art, a series of sculpted and painted tiles depicting, in a grotesque and obscene manner, the local legend of a Count who was cursed to haunt the nearby wilderness for all eternity.

The second part of the story begins in the year 2000, when failing movie star Todd Pickett decides to undergo plastic surgery to make himself look younger as prelude to his professional comeback.  Something goes wrong during the surgery, and Todd, now disfigured, is forced to go into hiding during his recovery.  His agent selects Katya Lupi's former home, an abandoned house in Coldheart Canyon, a secluded area outside Hollywood, where Todd soon discovers that Katya and her "subjects" still hold court.

2001 British novels
Novels by Clive Barker
British horror novels
Novels about actors
Fiction set in the 1920s
Novels set in Romania
Hollywood novels
HarperCollins books